Etobicoke Collegiate Institute (ECI, Etobicoke CI), previously known as Etobicoke High School is a high school in Toronto, Ontario, Canada. It is located in the Islington neighbourhood of the former suburb of Etobicoke. It is overseen by the Toronto District School Board. The school was founded in 1928 and was part of the former Etobicoke Board of Education until 1998.

History
Etobicoke High School was founded in the fall of 1928. It is one of Toronto's oldest schools and the first and traditionally central school for Etobicoke, having celebrated its 75th anniversary in 2003. The school was renamed to Etobicoke Collegiate Institute in 1949.

The 1928 entrance is an example of Art Deco architecture. The high school has about 1,450 students and over 100 teachers. Etobicoke Collegiate Institute is also the second-surviving high school in Etobicoke after the now-defunct Mimico High School (whose building now houses John English Junior Middle School).

The two schools compete in football and other sports and share a somewhat similar socioeconomic demographic. 
 
The school building has been a shooting location for a few films and commercials, including Mean Girls in 2003.

The Etobicoke Collegiate Institute extracurricular activity list stretches from music to most sports to Model U.N., Reach for the Top and the Robotics Team (2185). Competing in the FIRST Robotics Competition, 2007 results include a 23rd-place finish out of 63 teams in GTA championships. 2008 results include a 64th-place finish out of 66 teams in GTA championships. In 2009, the team won both the Waterloo and Greater Toronto Regional Championships. Going into the 2012 season, with a rookie team, finishing 17 out of 36 teams in GTA East Championships; defeated in the quarterfinals and finishing 44 out of 54 teams in the GTA West Championships; defeated in the semi-finals.

Etobicoke Collegiate's Student Administrative Council is made up of 10 elected student leaders.

Athletics
Fall Sports: Basketball, Football, Cross Country, Tennis, Golf, Volleyball

Winter Sports: Ice Hockey, Swimming, Badminton, Basketball, Volleyball, Curling

Spring Sports: Soccer, Baseball, Softball, Track and Field, Ultimate Frisbee, Lacrosse

Notable alumni 
 Ken Dryden, former Montreal Canadiens goaltender and former President of the Toronto Maple Leafs; former Member of Parliament
 Jeff Healey, rock musician
 Jeff Johnson, Toronto Argonauts running back
 Liam Killeen, drummer for Canadian pop-punk band Not By Choice, and New York-based band Cute Is What We Aim For
 Marnie McBean, gold medallist rower 
 Peter Milczyn, city councillor in Toronto, Ontario, Canada, representing one of the two Etobicoke—Lakeshore wards.
 Lisa Ray, actress, model
 Donald Smythe, four time national badminton champion, Thomas Cup player, All-England Championships 1953 finalist 
 Chris Stockwell, former cabinet minister in Mike Harris's Progressive
Conservative government in Ontario and Speaker of the Ontario Legislature

See also
List of high schools in Ontario

References

External links
Etobicoke Collegiate Institute
 TDSB Profile
 Etobicoke Collegiate Institute – Toronto District School Board

Education in Etobicoke
High schools in Toronto
Schools in the TDSB
Educational institutions established in 1928
1928 establishments in Ontario